Gustavo Andres Girón Marulanda (born 12 June 1986 in Colombia) is a Colombian footballer who plays for Sorrento FC in Perth, Australia.

Youth career

In 2004, Girón also played at youth teams for Once Caldas and Deportivo Pereira in Colombia.

Career

Australia

In 2009, Girón moved to Australia and signed for Bayswater City having a spell of about 5 seasons in National Premier Leagues and scoring about 120 in total competitions.
Girón also won the golden boot in 3 times in a row breaking the record of the National premier league in Australia. 2012-2013-2014

Girón has also featured in the state team of Western Australia 4 times, having been a key figure in Western Australia.

Indonesia
In January 2016 Girón became an Australian citizen, being able to play in Asia as an Asian quota player. He moved to Arema Cronus (then playing in the Indonesia Soccer Championship) in April 2016, playing half a season, scoring 3 goals and playing 7 games. Halfway into the season he moved to Persegres Gresik United.

Back to Australia
Girón returned to Perth in 2017 to play in the NPL Western Australia, playing for Bayswater City and Gwelup Croatia, before joining Sorrento FC in the 2022 season.

References 

Colombian emigrants to Australia
Colombian footballers
1986 births
Living people

Association football forwards
Arema F.C. players
Persegres Gresik players
Gresik United players